Club Xolos USA U-23, formerly Deportivo Coras USA, is an American soccer team based in Riverside, California and is affiliated with Mexican side Club Tijuana Xoloitzcuintles de Caliente. The club currently competes in the National Premier Soccer League in the  Southwest Conference, having joined the league as an expansion team in 2014.

History
Deportivo Coras began as an amateur, affiliated soccer club in 1966–67, shortly thereafter joining the Belvedere Soccer League in East Los Angeles, where they'd win two championships in the 1967 and 1968 seasons. The club joined the California League in 1969, where they'd play for over 30 seasons before joining So-Cal Premier League. Coras announced they would be joining NPSL on November 20, 2014, and played their inaugural season in NPSL in the 2015 season.  The club has an affiliation with Mexican club Deportivo Tepic FC.

In November 2019, the club rebranded as Club Xolos USA U-23, establishing an affiliation with Mexican side Club Tijuana.

Club Honors

 Socal Premier U-23 Champions: 2014

Rivalry
The team has one rival, Temecula FC, commonly known as the Riverside County Derby for the simple fact that both teams are in the same county. The Xolos have typically dominated the derby, beating Temecula for four straight seasons (2015-18). In 2019, the first match which was held in Temecula ended up 0-0, while the second match hosted by Riverside resulted in the Quails first win against Riverside in the NPSL, the score was 2–1.

In 2016, the two teams began an off-season tournament called the Riverside County Cup which runs through October to November. The tournament is an open invitation to local NPSL and UPSL teams within Riverside county and surrounding areas. The Coras won the Cup for the first time on November 10, 2019, when the team defeated two-time defending champion Temecula, 4–0.

Notable players
List of players that have gone to play professionally

Top goal scorer by NPSL season

Staff

Coaches

Front Office

 Robert Lopez-Guardado - Majority Owner
 Nora Lopez - Director of Business Operations
 Jose "Chepe" Esqueda - Team Manager
 Robert Vidrio - Sporting Director
 Steven Ramirez - Director of Media/Writer

References

External links

Twitter

National Premier Soccer League teams
Soccer clubs in Greater Los Angeles
Association football clubs established in 1966
1966 establishments in California
Diaspora soccer clubs in the United States